Charmaine Lea Mason (born 20 September 1970) is an Australian former cricketer who played as a right-arm fast bowler. She appeared in 5 Test matches and 46 One Day Internationals for Australia between 1992 and 2001. She played domestic cricket for Victoria.

References

External links
 
 
 Charmaine Mason at southernstars.org.au

Living people
1970 births
Cricketers from Sydney
Australia women Test cricketers
Australia women One Day International cricketers
Victoria women cricketers